The Centre Party '86, (Dutch: Centrumpartij '86; abbr. CP’86) briefly known as the National People's Party/CP'86 (Dutch:Nationale Volkspartij/CP’86) was a Dutch far-right political party which existed between 1986 and 1998. The party represented the importance of indigenous Dutch society. The CP'86 acted as a kind of threshold and continuation of the old Centre Party. The CP'86 was established on May 20, 1986 and dissolved on 18 November 1998, before an Amsterdam court ruled the party to be illegal.

History

Foundation
The day before the parliamentary elections of 1986, the manifesto 'restart' followed by Wim Wijngaarden and Danny Segers under the name CP'86. After long deliberation, the original program for the text of the NPD. Wijngaarden became chairman; years later in 1994, this was performed for Henk Ruitenberg's health reasons. The new name did not help nor did the new title of this party as "national-democratic" and later "popular-nationalist", instead of the former "center-democratic" as the former Centre Party used.

In the early years, the CP'86 did not develop well. There were many controversies and the trademark "Janmaat" of competitor CD proved stronger than the party expected. In the 1987 provincial elections, the provincial seat in Flevoland, which was occupied by Wim Beaux for the Centre Party, was lost. Elsewhere, too, none of the rival national-talk parties managed to get a seat. In 1989, the CP'86 did not even participate in the parliamentary elections that, incidentally, led to the renewed entry of Hans Janmaat into parliament, this time for CD.

Radicalization
On March 21, 1990 CP'86 won 11 seats in five municipalities. In 1990 the utility in the party had changed. A large group of young people from the then Youth Front Netherlands (JFN) allied with their former chairman Stewart Mordaunt found his more and more CP'86. Since then, the party used the original Celtic cross as an emblem. Mordaunt himself was elected in March in the municipal council of The Hague. This group ensured that the party became much more active and larger, but it also radicalized the party. Under the energetic leadership of Henk Ruitenberg, who joined in 1993, assisted by Tim Mudde who was known from the JFN, a satisfying revival of the party took place

From May 1992 to May 1996, Tim Mudde was party secretary who fully put his political street activism into practice. On March 2, 1994, the CP'86 won nine seats in seven municipal councils. However, the party no seats in the House of Representatives, not even May 1994, when it was headed for leeks. The number of council seats declined after the mid-nineties - despite the activism shown - adds as a result of the ever-improving economic prosperity. The party was reformed at the end of 1994 and renamed National People's Party / CP'86  to distinguish itself from other groups with regard to radical differences. This however remained unused.

Decline
The Ministry of Justice had been watching the party for some time. As part of the judicial investigation, there had been searches in September 1993 at the party administration. After these house searches it took considerable care for the structure to be re-established. When the CP'86 party leadership - intro is Martijn Freling, party chairman in Rotterdam - acted as racist statements in a public party meeting in 1995, the entire board lapped the leadership of a criminal organization. A conviction followed.

Major disagreement over the view of the party's presentation led to a situation. Men over and over again each other went out. and in February 1997 there where  two boards of CP'86, one under Mordaunt and the other under the anti-Freling direction under Beaux. This last wing, which wanted a 'neat' presentation, started in 1997 with a new party under the name Volksnationalisten Nederland (VNN) and Beaux president, by Henk Ruitenberg. With handy intervention of the publicity by means of beaten actions, the anti Beaux group of 1998 won in the municipal elections in Rotterdam, but the hoped-for success did not materialize. The VNN merged in 1998 with the newly established New National Party (NNP).

The Public Prosecution Service released 1995 and asked the court for a huge determination that CP'86 was not a political party, but a criminal organization. On September 30, 1997, the Supreme Court condemned the then central administration and former chairman Wijngaarden together with the party as a criminal organization that was systematically guilty of inciting xenophobia, which meant the end of CP'86.

The same was done in 1998 at the direction of the Minister of Justice Benk Korthals demanded a ban on the party. The Amsterdam court ruled on November 18, 1998. The court states that the party was a criminal organization" Prior to the verdict, the party had long since become an empty shell. Chairman Freling: not to appeal the court. The organization was dissolved.

Electoral Performance

House of Representatives

References

External links
Right-Wing Extremism in the Netherlands: Why it is still a marginal phenomenon Dr. Paul Lucardie, DNPP (RUG), November 2000

Banned far-right parties
Defunct political parties in the Netherlands
Political parties established in 1986
Political parties disestablished in 1998
1986 establishments in the Netherlands
Neo-Nazism in the Netherlands
Third Position